

But and ben (or butt and ben) is an architectural style for a simple building, usually applied to a residence. The etymology is from the Scots term for a two-roomed cottage. The term describes a basic design of "outer room" conjoined with "inner room" as a residential building plan; the outer room, used as an antechamber or kitchen, is the but, while the inner room is the ben.  The word but, here, comes from Early Scots/Middle English "bouten" "outside", and ben from ES/ME "binnen", "inside".

See also

 Blackhouse
 Bothy
 Cottage
 The Broons

References
 C. Michael Hogan, Knossos fieldnotes, Modern Antiquarian (2007)
 Ernest Ingersoll (1906) The Wit of the Wild, Published by Dodd, Mead and company, 294 pages

Line notes

Architecture in Scotland
House types
Housing in Scotland
Agricultural buildings
Agriculture in Scotland
Vernacular architecture
Scots language
Scottish words and phrases